Marjorie Godfrey (29 March 1919 – 27 October 2003) was an Anglo-Indian nominated member of 5th Lok Sabha and Andhra Pradesh Legislative Assembly.

Early life
Marjorie was born on 29 March 1919 at Hyderabad, Andhra Pradesh. She received her Bachelor of Arts degree from Osmania University.

Career
An educationist, Godfrey for 17 years acted as the Superintendent-in-Charge of Examinations and Selections. She established The Catholic Association of Hyderabad. She was one of the two Anglo-Indian members nominated to the 5th Lok Sabha in 1971. Prior to that, she had been a nominated member of Andhra Pradesh Legislative Assembly for four years and a Vice President of All India Anglo-Indian Association's governing body.

Godfrey had also served on the Central Social Welfare Advisory Board and represented Andhra Pradesh at the Inter-State Board for Anglo-Indian Education.

Personal life
On 10 January 1949, Marjorie was married to Allen Godfrey. The couple had two children. She died on 27 October 2003, due to cardiac arrest. Andhra Pradesh Council of Churches and The Catholic Association of Hyderabad condoled her death.

Her daughter Della Godfrey was also a nominated member of Andhra Pradesh state assembly.

References

1919 births
2003 deaths
Politicians from Hyderabad, India
Osmania University alumni
India MPs 1971–1977
Women members of the Lok Sabha
Anglo-Indian people
Indian Roman Catholics
Women members of the Andhra Pradesh Legislative Assembly
Nominated members of the Lok Sabha
Members of the Andhra Pradesh Legislative Assembly
20th-century Indian women
20th-century Indian people